The TRAINOSE Class 520, also known as the AEG DE IC-2000N, is the oldest class of trainsets operated by TRAINOSE. They are diesel-powered, they can be DMU-5 or DMU-4 and were built in 1989 and 1995 as class 601 and 651, respectively, from the cooperation of West Germany's AEG and East Germany's LEW, and for about two decades they were the spearhead of the fast- interurban quality trains (InterCity). Sometimes, DMU-4 units circulate coupled with another truck. In total, there are 20 such trainsets, 12 DMU-4 and 8 DMU-5.

The DMU-4 are numbered 520 101 to 520 412, while the DMU-5 520 151 to 520 558. The 1st batch trainsets can accommodate up to 180 seated passengers, 36 in the first class and 144 in the second, while the second batch trainsets can accommodate up to 214, 75 in the first class and 144 in the second. They have MTU diesel engines with combined power of 2170 kW (1050 x 2 diesel motors MTU 12V396TC13 with supercharger M.T.U ZR170/137) and reaching speeds of up to 180 km / h.

Route 
AEG DE IC-2000Ns serve long-distance trains on the Thessaloniki-Alexandroupolis & Alexandroupoli-Ormenio route and local trains on the Alexandroupolis-Svilengrad line.

History

1980s: Beginning 
In 1986, OSE, in the context of upgrading the fleet, proceeded to order new high quality  and specification trainsets. Under contract 5701/1986, 12 AEG / LEW trainsets are ordered. The trainsets consist of 4 coaches. Intermediate vehicles are manufactured by East German Bautzen.

As a product of co-operation between the two Germans, new trainsets bring some innovations. The new 12-cylinder MTU 396 TC 13 engines each deliver 1450 horsepower to the 1800 rounds per minute turbocharger. To meet the electrical needs of the train there are 2 generating sets each consisting of a 250-horsepower MAN D2866TUE diesel engine and a generator AvK Dkbs 49 / 150-4. The trains have a SIBAS control system, ergonomically controlled panoramic glass pane, air conditioning. each of the diesel engines rotates a generator that supplies current to 2 underground electric motors. Each electric drive transmits the movement to its trolley with Cardan transmission bridges. The axle configuration is B0, B0 + 2,2 + 2,2 + B0, B0.

The interior of the trains for their time was the most luxurious of the Greek railways. The luxurious and comfortable seats are airy, and are divided into 144 seats of B class and 36 of A class. There was a canteen and a kitchen for the meal preparation in the intermediate vehicle of the A class. Serving at the seats is done as it was on airplanes. The comfort of the trip is helped by the newcomer to the Greek train, air-conditioning while for the better absorption of the solar rays, the passenger coach windows are smoked with copper. Finally, the vehicles are fully soundproofed and equipped with an announcement system. Class 520 trainsets wagons were mainly used in long-distance interconnections across the Greek normal network range. Specifically, they took on the burden of the (Piraeus) Athens-Thessaloniki-Alexandroupolis, Athens-Volos, Athens-Kalampaka and Athens-Kozani fast routes.

90s-today 
In 1993, OSE, in view of the small capacity of the trains, ordered additional trainsets. New trainsets are manufactured by AEG in Henningsdorf. Differences are insignificant at both mechanical and operational levels. The addition of an intermediate coach with 54 A-seat seats gives the opportunity to create a space for the vehicle with a canteen. Thus, the new trains feature 144 class B seats, 75 class A seats and 12 unnamed seats as a dining room.

Since 2004 and the launching of new passenger coaches on these routes, their role has been gradually reduced. In 2007 and with the departure of the Siemens Desiro Classic from the Greek network, they were launched on the new Athens-Corinth-Kiato dual line. During the following years, they were demoted on local and regional routes on the Athens-Halkida, Athens-Lianokladi-Stylida, Athens-Larissa, Thessaloniki-Larisa-Kalampaka and Larissa-Volos routes.

Until 2011, 520 class continued to run InterCity and ICE on the Thessaloniki-Athens route as well as various other types of service across the country. Following the OSE reorganization program, they were limited to local Athens-Lianocladi, Thessaloniki-Florina, Thessaloniki-Kalampaka and Alexandroupolis-Dikaia routes. From 2011, they only perform the local Athens-Lianocladi and Athens-Larissa and remain only in double couling of fast routes on the axis. These routes will cease to be secured by trainsets since August of that year to be reset in January 2017 on train 58/51. From 2012 they are re-established in the connection between Thessaloniki and Florina. Apart from a short return to InterCity Thessaloniki-Athens in the first half of 2017, today they are operating the routes listed in the section "Route"

In July 2017, the trainsets will carry out the last high-speed route on the Athens-Thessaloniki axis and will permanently abandon their 28-year seat, the Agios Ioannis Rentis Depot, to be transported to the Thessaloniki Depot where they continue to serve in Northern Greece.

Livery 
Trainset's coloring consists of a large red horizontal stripe on a white / cream color that covers most of the coaches.

Bibliography 
 Greek magazine "Σιδηροτροχια", issue 19, p:32-34 (1999)
 "Συλλογος Φιλων του Σιδηροδρομου: Οι Ελληνικοί Σιδηροδρομοι η διαδρομη τους απο το 1869 εως σήμερα" (The Greek Railways, their route from 1869 to date), σελ: 166-167, Εκδόσεις Μίλητος

References

External links 

 http://www.railfaneurope.net/list_frameset.html
 theodore.gr/theodore.gr/Transport_Trains_Locomotives.html

Diesel multiple units
Diesel multiple units of Greece